Changriwa is a Yuat language of Papua New Guinea. It is spoken in Changriwa village, Angoram/Middle Sepik Rural LLG, East Sepik Province.

References

Yuat languages
Languages of East Sepik Province